Amin Al-Hamawi (born 17 December 2003), is an Iraqi-Swedish professional footballer who plays as a striker for Allsvenskan club Helsingborgs IF and the Iraq U-23 national team.

Club career

Helsingborgs IF
Spending his entire youth career at local club Helsingborgs IF having joined the academy as an 8-year-old, Al-Hamawi signed his first professional contract with the team in March 2022 after scoring 24 goals in 23 matches for the U19 side, where he was vice-captain, the previous season.

Torns IF
Immediately after signing his first professional contract, Al-Hamawi was loaned out to third-tier club Torns IF, where he quickly impressed, starting 4 matches and scoring 3 goals in the Ettan.

Back to Helsingborgs
After impressing during his loan spell at Torns IF, Amin was recalled to his parent club in June 2022 and made his Allsvenskan debut against Malmö FF on 27 June, coming on as a substitute in the 69th minute. He scored his first senior goal in a 3-1 defeat to Varberg BoIS on 15 October 2022.

International career
Born in Iraq and moving to Sweden as an infant, Al-Hamawi chose to represent his country of birth internationally.

Under-23
Amin received his first call-up for the U-23s in January 2022 for a training camp in Antalya, Turkey in preparation for the 2022 AFC U-23 Asian Cup, which he also made the final squad for despite not making an appearance at the tournament. He made his official debut in a friendly match against Iran U-23 in May 2022, coming on in the second half.

References

2003 births
Living people
Iraqi footballers
Iraq youth international footballers
Iraqi expatriate footballers
Expatriate footballers in Sweden
Iraqi expatriate sportspeople in Sweden
Swedish footballers
Swedish people of Iraqi descent
Allsvenskan players
Helsingborgs IF players
Ettan Fotboll players
Torns IF players